"Burning Star" is a pop duet recorded by Belgian singer Natalia and American singer Anastacia, used to promote their concert series Natalia Meets Anastacia. The single was produced by Hans Francken and written by Luke Boyd, Micah Otano and Mike Barkulis. The song premiered on 17 September 2010 on Q-Music Radio. It peaked at #45 on the Swiss Singles Chart on the week of release.

Background
The single was released on September 17, 2010, as a special gift for Anastacia's birthday. She commented, "The song I did with Natalia called Burning Star airs around September 17th... It is not a bad b-day gift for me! Eh! Eh! Eh! I really like this song! It's a track that's on my next album, so I hope you guys like it!" On September 20, Natalia was a guest on the Q-Music radio show Ornelis en Rogiers Ochtendshow, where she promoted the single. Anastacia joined her by a phone call directly from her home in United States.

Track listing
 Digital Download
 "Burning Star" — 3:33

 German CD single
 "Burning Star" - 3:33
 "Burning Star" (Demo) - 3:18

Charts

Release history

References

2011 singles
Anastacia songs
Female vocal duets
Dance-pop songs